Thomas Seelye Arms (March 22, 1893 – September 30, 1970) was a brigadier general during World War II. During the war, He commanded the 159th Infantry Regiment and the Replacement and Training Command.

Early life and career 
Arms was born in Cleveland, Ohio. Prior to military service, he attended Virginia Military Institute and graduated with a bachelor's degree in science. During World War I, he was commissioned into the infantry. After the war, Arms served as instructor at the Infantry School and the Ohio National Guard.

World War II 
During World War II, Arms was commander of the 159th Infantry regiment until 1942. He was an instructor in China and India until February 1945. In March of that year, he was promoted to Brigadier General, but reverted to Colonel in the following month. In the final year of his service, Arms was commander of the Replacement and Training Command.

Later life 

Arms retired from service on September, 1946. He died on September 30, 1970.

Personal life 
Arms had a son named Thomas Seelye Arms Jr., who also was an American military officer.

References

External links 

Generals of World War II

United States Army generals
1893 births
1970 deaths
Virginia Military Institute alumni
People from Cleveland
Recipients of the Distinguished Service Medal (US Army)
Recipients of the Legion of Merit
United States Army personnel of World War I
United States Army generals of World War II
Military personnel from Ohio